The Jones Tract is an island containing Lower Jones Tract and the Upper Jones Tract in the Sacramento-San Joaquin River Delta, fifteen kilometres west of Stockton. The  island is bounded on the north by Empire Cut, on the northeast by Whiskey Slough, on the southeast by Trapper Slough, and on the west, Middle River. The tracts are  bifurcated by the parallel running Mokelumne Aqueduct, West Lower Jones Road, and a railroad originally built by the Achison Topeka and Santa Fe Railroad, which now carries freight trains of the BNSF Railway and Amtrak California's San Joaquin. It is in San Joaquin County, and managed by Reclamation District 2039. It appears on 1913 and 1952 United States Geological Survey maps of the area.

2004 levee failure
The island, which lies 3 metres below sea level, required three weeks to repair the breach, and an additional five months for de-watering after the pumps were shut down on 18 December 2004. The levee failure resulted in approximately $90 million in repairs.

See also
 List of islands of California

References

External links 
 
 



Islands of the Sacramento–San Joaquin River Delta
Islands of Northern California
Islands of San Joaquin County, California
Islands of California